Ruth Rosamond Edwards (née Davis, 11 May 1984) is a British politician who was elected as the Member of Parliament (MP) for Rushcliffe in the 2019 general election. A member of the Conservative Party, she worked in cybersecurity policy prior to her political career.

Early life and career
Davis was born in Bristol as the daughter of Christopher Charles Davis and Nelly Davis. She attended Clifton High School, before studying theology at the London School of Theology, where she gained a First Class BA in Theology. She went on to complete a master's MSc degree in International Development and Security at the University of Bristol, achieving a Distinction. After graduation, she worked as a parliamentary researcher for then Shadow Minister for Home Affairs and Counter Terrorism Crispin Blunt. She then worked as a strategy consultant for Deloitte from 2010 to 2012.

Davis subsequently worked as a specialist for the Home Affairs Select Committee from 2012 to 2013. She then completed a crime and justice research fellowship at the think tank Policy Exchange in 2013. She left Policy Exchange to become Head of Cyber, Justice and Emergency Services at the trade association TechUK, where she worked from 2013 to 2015. After this, Davis worked as the head of commercial strategy and public policy for the telecommunications company BT from 2015 to 2019.

Parliamentary career
Davis stood as the Conservative candidate for the Liberal Democrat-held Ceredigion seat at the 2017 general election, where she came fourth. The seat was gained by Plaid Cymru.

Following her marriage, she became known as Ruth Edwards, and was selected as the candidate for the safe seat of Rushcliffe on 16 October 2019. The seat had previously been represented by Father of the House, and former Chancellor of the Exchequer Kenneth Clarke since 1970, who announced his retirement on 27 June. Edwards was elected with a majority of 7,643 in the 2019 general election. She was a member of the Home Affairs Select Committee from March 2020 to November 2021. 

Edwards was the Parliamentary Private Secretary to the Secretary of State for Scotland Alister Jack between February 2020 and July 2022. She resigned from the role in July 2022 in protest against Prime Minister Boris Johnson's handling of the Chris Pincher scandal. She accused him of leading a government which "turned a blind eye to allegations of sexual assault within its own ranks."

Outside of her parliamentary role, she was also an adviser to the HR payroll software company MHR, for which Mongoose Bridges, a company that she co-owns with her husband, received £5,000 a month between May 2021 and December 2021.

Edwards endorsed Rishi Sunak during the July–September 2022 Conservative Party leadership election.

Personal life
She married Owen Edwards in July 2019. They met during her 2017 general election campaign, when he was the chairman of Ceredigion's Conservative Association. Her recreations are listed in Who's Who as "scuba diving, horticulture, alpaca wrangling, tea and cake consumption, travel".

References

External links

1984 births
21st-century English women politicians
21st-century English politicians
Alumni of the London School of Theology
Alumni of the University of Bristol
British Telecom people
Conservative Party (UK) MPs for English constituencies
Female members of the Parliament of the United Kingdom for English constituencies
Living people
Politicians from Bristol
UK MPs 2019–present